Katahyunne Laudanne "Katayoun" Khosrowyar (born 19 September 1987), commonly known as Kathy or Kat Khosrowyar, is an Iranian-American football coach, chemical engineer, energy policy expert, and philanthropist. She is better known as the former head coach of the Iran U-19 National Women's Football team.

Career
Khosrowyar was born in Tulsa, Oklahoma, to an Iranian father and American mother. She lived with her father after her parents separated, and started playing soccer when she was five years old.  She played for a then-highly-ranked club in Oklahoma (Tulsa Soccer Club) and was one of the top players from Oklahoma representing the state and region.  Khosrowyar also played varsity soccer, field hockey, and track and field at her private high school Holland Hall.  She decided to move to Iran in 2005, during her first visit when she was only 17 years old after accepting to play for Iran. She played in Madrid, Spain for Carranza FC from 2006 to 2008.  In 2010, Katayoun was nominated by the Asian Football Confederation (The AFC) to participate in Project Future, a coaching program for soccer players under 30. After retiring from playing in 2013, Kat earned a FIFA/AFC 'A' license in 2014, the first Iranian woman to do so. The purpose, she tells Women’s Soccer Coaching, is to “put all my skills, abilities and experience under one umbrella”. It would need to be a sizeable umbrella. Katayoun Khosrowyar has a master's degree in chemical engineering from the University of Birmingham in the United Kingdom and recently completed a second master's degree in Global Affairs at Rice University.

Khosrowyar moved back to the United States in 2019 to become the head coach of OL Reign Academy. She is currently part of the Asian American Pacific Islander United Soccer Coaches Leadership Team and is a Board Member of the Women's Equality in Soccer Foundation.

Awards
Khosrowyar has won the 2018 Women's Soccer United Coach Award, awarded to inspirational coaches in women’s soccer based on a public poll. Khosrowyar was also nominated best coach of Asia 2019 alongside Japan's head coach Asako Takakura.

The Middle East and Central Asia
 
In 2011, she was a part of the 'Let Us Play'campaign led by Prince Ali bin Hussein of Jordan that helped overturn a FIFA hijab ban. FIFA allowed 'head covering for religious reasons for every Muslim female player in the organization’s member countries. This was critical for Iranian female football players to continue to play in FIFA competitions after being banned from playing during the second round of pre-Olympic qualifications.

After the Taliban banned the participation of girls in sports in September 2021, Khosrowyar was part of a group that was formed to help a group of 80 people, composed of 26 members of the Afghani female youth team, to leave the country and pursue soccer careers internationally.

References

External links
 Meet the Iranian-American leader in Women's football
 My Coaching Journey – Kat Khosrowyar

1987 births
Living people
Iranian women's footballers
Iran women's international footballers
Iranian football managers
Female association football managers
Women's association football managers
American women's soccer players
Soccer players from Oklahoma
Sportspeople from Tulsa, Oklahoma
American people of Iranian descent
Sportspeople of Iranian descent
American women's soccer coaches
21st-century American women
Women's association football midfielders